Piano Sonata in F-sharp minor may refer to:

 Piano Sonata No. 2 (Brahms)
 Sonatine (Ravel)
 Piano Sonata in F-sharp minor, D 571 (Schubert)
 Piano Sonata No. 1 (Schumann)
 Piano Sonata No. 3 (Scriabin)
 Piano Sonata in F-sharp minor (Stravinsky)